Pleasanton in Irvington Historic District is a national historic district located at Indianapolis, Indiana.  It encompasses 149 contributing buildings and 1 contributing site in a planned residential section of Indianapolis.  The district developed between about 1915 and 1959, and includes representative examples of Tudor Revival, Colonial Revival, and Bungalow / American Craftsman style residential architecture.

It was listed on the National Register of Historic Places in 2010.

References

Historic districts on the National Register of Historic Places in Indiana
Tudor Revival architecture in Indiana
Colonial Revival architecture in Indiana
Bungalow architecture in Indiana
Historic districts in Indianapolis
National Register of Historic Places in Indianapolis